Gilaki and Mazandarani may refer to:

 Gilaki people, people native to the northern Iran province of Gilan
 Gilaki language, a Caspian language spoken in Iran's Gilan, Mazanderan, Qazvin Province
 Mazanderani people, Iranian people whose homeland is the North of Iran (Tabaristan)
 Mazanderani language, an Iranian language spoken mainly in Iran's Mazandaran, Tehran and Golestan provinces

See also 
 Gilaki (disambiguation)
 Mazanderani (disambiguation)
 Tabrian (disambiguation)
 Caspian people (disambiguation)
 Caspian languages, the group to which the Gilaki and Mazandarani languages belong
 Iranian peoples, a diverse Indo-European ethno-linguistic group